Antalya Marathon, officially International Öger Antalya Marathon, shortly Runtalya, is an international athletic event that takes place in Antalya annually since 2006. The marathon is organized in March. Sponsored by the Germany-based Öger Tours of Turkish-German Vural Öger, it is the second only marathon race in Turkey to Istanbul Marathon. Master men, master women and wheelchair competitions, as well as  public run are held during the event.

Most of the competitors come from Germany. In 2008, 165 of the 351 athletes, who finished the race, were Germans.

The course is a turning point route, which is measured by IAAF rules. The route runs through the old city past Yivliminare Mosque and Hadrian's Gate shortly after the start line at Antalya Museum (since 2008), and continues then parallel to the cliffy coast towards east. Lara, Antalya is the finish line for the 10 km race, and the turning point for half marathon runners. Marathon athletes return past the themed 5- to 7-star hotels at Lara Beach. All race categories end in Antalya Atatürk Stadium.

The race organization committee decided not to invite athletes from Africa anymore beginning with the 2010 event.

Records
Marathon
 Men's 2:16:14 Phillip Makau Muia (KEN), 2008
Women's: 2:42:55 Kristijna Loonen (NED), 2008

Half marathon
 Men's: 1:04:00 James Kirwa (KEN), 2007
Women's 1:12:43 Bahar Doğan (TUR), 2009

10 km
Men's: 29:30 Bekir Karayel (TUR), 2009
Women's: 33:09 Mariam Tanga (ETH), 2009

Winners
Key:

References

External links
 Route map

Sport in Antalya
2006 establishments in Turkey
Marathons in Turkey
Annual events in Turkey
Recurring sporting events established in 2006
Spring (season) events in Turkey